Service95 is a weekly lifestyle newsletter founded in 2021 by English singer Dua Lipa. Announced in November 2021, the newsletter's first issue was released on 3 February 2022. Described as a "global style, culture, and society concierge service created to help the reader make sense of the world", each newsletter features a personal letter from Lipa alongside several articles from guest contributors. It features topics including recommendations, travel advice and politics and ranges from lighthearted stories to hard-hitting reporting. The goal of the newsletter according to its founder, is to broaden the scope of journalism by featuring pieces that can't be found elsewhere.

Lipa was inspired to create the newsletter from the lists of recommendations she had created for her friends since she was a child. The newsletter is based in London. It is delivered weekly to subscribers via email in a choice of 12 languages. An accompanying podcast hosted by Lipa entitled Dua Lipa: At Your Service was launched on 11 February 2022. The podcasts feature in-depth conversations between Lipa and high-profile guests. The goal of the podcast is to help listeners learn more about themselves through  her guests' stories. The podcast is available in four languages.

History
On 23 November 2021, English singer Dua Lipa announced that she would launch a free weekly newsletter entitled Service95 in January 2022. It was described as a "global style, culture, and society concierge service created to help the reader make sense of the world" and "a way to find order in the chaos"; Lipa described it as "a general store with all the content you've always wanted to read". Lipa was inspired to create the newsletter by her longtime hobby of sharing personally-curated lists with her closest friends that mentioned lesser-known "people, pieces of pop culture, travel destinations, hidden gems and global issues". The singer had been "obsessively" making the lists since she was a child and they have become her friends' "go-to" for recommendations. Once Lipa started touring, her passion for the lists grew as she was getting to explore the world. The singer said her parents would make fun of her for making the lists. Lipa stated that she created the lists as a "fear of forgetting to share" as well as a way to connect with loved ones and the fact that she loves documenting her experiences. She went on to say "the more we share with each other, the closer we become, the wider our circles grow" and that's she finds "huge joy in telling people what [she's] learned about in any given city and love finding connection in our shared experiences" with Service95 taking that idea and bringing it to anyone who is as curious as she is about life. The newsletter name comes from Lipa's birth year, 1995, and the fact that she has always seen herself as "of service" to her friends and family through these lists, and now to her fans. Lipa registered the trademark from Service95 in June 2021. Subscriptions were available simultaneously upon the announcement and those who subscribed within the first 48 hours were deemed "founding members".

Service95 is a lifestyle newsletter that covers fashion, beauty, the arts, politics, global issues, insights into Lipa's life as well as travel, music, food and book recommendations. It includes articles from celebrities as well as social commentary, comedic features and recommendations including late-night snacks, hotspots, up-and-coming artists, grassroots activists, and travel tips. The newsletter is intended to give young people the tools to make a difference, because for them the news can be quite intense and older individuals may want to help but don't know how. Lipa also intended to broaden the types and scopes of stories one might read. She mentioned that the newsletter is all about accessibility, meaning that the idea behind it is sharing information and helping one another. Some issues focus on a single story, giving it space to breathe while others will pair lighthearted features with hard-hitting reporting. Lipa teased that the newsletter would include "everything from underground galleries in Brazil, to little-known diners in Louisiana and the best manicurists in Lagos" as well as "her favourite tucked-away hotel in Paris, to the best spot for dumplings in the 11th arrondissement, to the playlist she made to listen to on the flight home". Every issue includes a personal letter from Lipa that mentions where she is in the world and her tips on what she's been doing. Service95 is published by Studio 2054 Productions and is based in London, UK. It is sent to subscribers via email and is available in Albanian, Arabic, English, French, German, Indonesian, Italian, Japanese, Korean, Portuguese, Russian and Spanish. A website is set to be launched where users can search for recommendations and articles. Lipa described it as an extension to the photo dumps she posts on Instagram. The first issue was scheduled for January 2022 but launched on 3 February 2022.

In the first issue, Lipa gave an update on her Future Nostalgia Tour and the Dua Lipa: At Your Service podcast while mentioning her five favourite restaurants in London. There were articles on amapiano, a house music subgenre emerging in South Africa, a feature on Sinéad Burke about her work designing things to be more accessible for more diverse individuals, one on a Hong Kong-based, all-female roller derby crew and one on a Paris-based homeware store.

Dua Lipa: At Your Service
{{Infobox podcast
| title          = Dua Lipa: At Your Service
| image          = Dua Lipa At Your Service.png
| alt            = A black and white picture of Dua Lipa showing just over half of her face. The podcast title, Dua Lipa: At Your Service appears in the top right in a circle, written in all caps blue letters, while Service95, the companion newsletter, is written in the bottom right.
| hosting        = Dua Lipa
| format         = Streaming
| language       = 
| production     = Studio 2054 Productions
| num_episodes   = 13
| began          = 11 February 2022
| provider       = iHeartRadio
}}

Alongside the announcement of Service95, Lipa revealed that a companion podcast entitled Dua Lipa: At Your Service would also accompany the newsletter. The podcast is intended for Lipa to have deep conversations with a line up of high-profile guests. She explained: "though a lot of my guests have done their fair share of talking, I want to go deeper with them. Not only am I probing them about the things I'm most curious about, I'm also treating them like the experts they are". Lipa mentioned that the conversations cover global concerns and casual chats while she hopes that listeners will learn something about themselves from the inspiring stories guests will tell.

The goal of the conversations is "understanding their journey in a way that when people listen to it, it feels like it's of service, like the whole conversation, whether it's how a certain author got to where they are, how it all happened, relationship advice, growing up in the industry, understanding what that's like, what it takes to really get to where you want to be". Lipa stated that it's interesting being on the other side of the interview, which is a skill she has been developing and really enjoying, specifically saying she loves the research element of it and learning about people. The podcast launched on 11 February 2022 and publishes weekly. It is produced by Studio 2054 Productions and is available in English, French, Portuguese and Spanish. The podcast is distributed by iHeartRadio. Its first season consisted of 12 episodes and featured guests including Russell Brand, CL, Edward Enninful, Elton John, Megan Thee Stallion, Nadia Murad, Olivier Rousteing, Lisa Taddeo, Hanya Yanagihara and Bowen Yang.

Episodes

Special

Season 1 (2022)

Season 2 (2022)

Critical reception
In The Telegraph, Rebecca Reid stated "Lipa might really be on to something" as the contributors "have certainly grasped what made all lifestyle blogs great". She continued stating it contains "a feeling that you're discovering things you'd never be cool enough to find on your own, and the kind of recommendation you can pass on to a friend you want to impress while acting like you discovered it yourself". She concluded by stating "it's all the joys of the mid 00's blogosphere, tempered with an inclusive 2022 twist". For Elle, Lucy Cocoran said Service95 is like "an exclusive invitation into Dua's world, as seen through her eyes" while also complimenting her passion for "making it a platform for marginalised voices, bringing important issues to light in a digestible way". The Guardian reviewer Hannah Verdier complimented Lipa's interviewing skills in Dua Lipa: At Your Service while stating that if the world needs another celebrity interview podcast, she's glad it's Lipa. The reviewer explained by naming the podcast a "thoughtful batch of interviews" that is "a far cry from the interruption-filled rambling of some celebrity pods". Eoghan O'Sullivan of the Irish Examiner praised the guests that appear on the podcast; the reviewer named the Olivier Rousteing episode the "best of the bunch", specifically complimenting Lipa's empathy towards Rousteing and the content he talks about. For the Irish Independent, Tony Clayton-Lea named Dua Lipa: At Your Service'' the "Podcast of the Week" in April 2022. He called it a "bold" intention for Lipa and said these intentions of solidified by the "obvious" and unexpected choice of guests.

Footnotes

References

External links
 Dua Lipa introducing Service95 on Twitter

2021 establishments in England
Dua Lipa
Newsletters